"Somewhere a Voice Is Calling" is a World War I song originally released in 1911. Arthur F. Tate composed the song and Eileen Newton wrote the lyrics. The song was published by T. B. Harms & Francis, Day & Hunter, Inc. in New York City.

The song was recorded on October 29, 1913 by vocalist Henry Burr in Camden, New Jersey. This version was released under the Victor record label.

In 1914, John McCormack recorded "Somewhere a Voice Is Calling". It was released under the Victor record label.

Another best-selling 1914 version was by Vernon Archibald and Elizabeth Spencer, released on Edison's Blue Amberol cylinders.

Lyrics

References

1911 songs
Songs of World War I
Victor Talking Machine Company singles